Franco Sosa (born 19 September 1999) is an Argentine footballer currently playing as a forward for Argentino Quilmes.

Club career
Sosa made his senior debut for Temperley in a 1–3 loss to Independiente Rivadavia, replacing Claudio Darío Salina for the final 23 minutes.

International career
Shortly after making his debut, Sosa was called up to the Argentina under-17 squad for friendly games against Uruguay.

Personal life
Sosa has two brothers, Agustín and Leandro, who are also professional footballers.

Career statistics

Notes

References

1999 births
Living people
Argentine footballers
Argentina youth international footballers
Association football forwards
Primera Nacional players
Primera B Metropolitana players
Club Atlético Temperley footballers
Argentino de Quilmes players